José Ántónio Ramos Ribeiro (born 11 September 1977), commonly known as Zé Tó, is a Portuguese retired footballer who played mainly as an attacking midfielder.

Club career
Born in Lubango, Angola, Zé Tó began his professional career at Vitória de Setúbal, but could never break into the main squad. After a stint in the lower leagues, he first made an impact in the Primeira Liga with S.C. Farense.

In the summer of 2000, Zé Tó joined Spain's UD Salamanca, a team that also included three compatriots. After a one and a half year on loan to fellow second level side CD Badajoz, he returned and began appearing regularly (after only eight league games from August 2000–December 2001), going on to amass 186 official appearances for the former.

After an unassuming 2008–09 season – five matches, 141 minutes of action – Zé Tó was released, arranging a deal with another Spanish club, lowly AD Cerro de Reyes, Badajoz's neighbours. However, he quickly grew unsettled, returning to his country after nearly ten years and moving to the regional leagues with Estrela de Vendas Novas.

References

External links

1977 births
Living people
People from Lubango
Portuguese twins
Twin sportspeople
Portuguese footballers
Association football midfielders
Primeira Liga players
Vitória F.C. players
Lusitano G.C. players
S.C. Farense players
Segunda División players
Segunda División B players
UD Salamanca players
CD Badajoz players
Portugal B international footballers
Portuguese expatriate footballers
Expatriate footballers in Spain
Portuguese expatriate sportspeople in Spain